7th Nova Scotia general election may refer to:

Nova Scotia general election, 1793, the 7th general election to take place in the Colony of Nova Scotia, for the 7th General Assembly of Nova Scotia
1890 Nova Scotia general election, the 29th overall general election for Nova Scotia, for the (due to a counting error in 1859) 30th Legislative Assembly of Nova Scotia, but considered the 7th general election for the Canadian province of Nova Scotia